Spix's spinetail (Synallaxis spixi), also known as the Chicli spinetail, is a bird in the ovenbird family. It is found in Brazil, Argentina and Uruguay. The common name commemorates the German naturalist Johann Baptist von Spix (1782-1826).

Description
It has a dark throat patch and a contrasting rufous crown and wings. The tail structure is also typical of the genus, being long and steeply graduated, with sharply pointed individual feathers, the central pair thinning towards the tip.

Breeding
The nest is cylindrical in shape, with a long lateral entrance tube. It is made from thorny sticks, has a dense roof to provide protection from rain, and is lined with leaves, moss and hair.

References

Spix's spinetail
Birds of Argentina
Birds of the Atlantic Forest
Birds of Brazil
Birds of Uruguay
Spix's spinetail
Spix's spinetail
Taxonomy articles created by Polbot